Proprioseiopsis acalyphae is a species of mite in the family Phytoseiidae.

References

acalyphae
Articles created by Qbugbot
Animals described in 1999